The 1964 Rice Owls football team represented Rice University during the 1964 NCAA University Division football season. In its 25th season under head coach Jess Neely, the team compiled a 4–5–1 record and outscored opponents by a total of 117 to 111. The team played its home games at Rice Stadium in Houston.

The team's statistical leaders included Walter McReynolds with 675 passing yards, Gene Fleming with 395 rushing yards and 30 points scored, and Billy Hale with 170 receiving yards. Malcolm Walker was selected by the Associated Press (AP) and the United Press International (UPI) as the first-team center on the 1964 All-Southwest Conference football team.

Schedule

References

Rice
Rice Owls football seasons
Rice Owls football